The Egyptian weekly magazine al-Mathaf (Arabic: المتحف; DMG: al-Matḥaf; "The Museum") was owned and published by Yaʿqūb Nawfal and Qusṭanṭīn Nawfal in Alexandria in 1894. 1 Despite its name, it had nothing to do with artifacts. It describes itself as a news magazine that provides information on science, economics and fine arts.

References

1894 establishments in Egypt
1894 disestablishments in Egypt
Arabic-language magazines
Defunct magazines published in Egypt
Magazines established in 1894
Magazines disestablished in 1894
Mass media in Alexandria
News magazines published in Africa
Weekly magazines published in Egypt
Weekly news magazines